Hardial Bains (15 August 1939 – 24 August 1997) was an Indo-Canadian microbiology lecturer, but was primarily known as the founder of a series of left-wing movements and parties foremost of which was the Communist Party of Canada (Marxist–Leninist) (CPC (ML)). Presenting himself as staunchly anti-revisionist and pro-Stalinist, until his death, Bains acted as the spokesperson and ideological leader of the CPC (ML) — known in elections as the Marxist–Leninist Party of Canada. During his lifetime, Bains' outlook swung from supporting the Soviet Union under Joseph Stalin, to Mao Zedong's China, then later to Enver Hoxha's Albania. Shortly before he died, and abandoning his previous sharp criticisms of the country, Bains turned to Fidel Castro's Cuba for inspiration. Spending most of his life in Canada, Bains was also politically active in England, Ireland, United States and India.

Biography 
Born in India into a communist Sikh family in the Punjab, Bains became a member of the youth wing of the Communist Party of India (CPI). He was dismayed by what he saw as the revisionism of Nikita Khrushchev following the death of Joseph Stalin. He broke with the party when the CPI, during an underground period, supported Khrushchev's criticisms of Stalin. Shortly after, Bains immigrated to Canada and enrolled as a graduate student in bacteriology at the University of British Columbia (UBC), where he was an elected student leader.

In 1963, he helped found "The Internationalists", which evolved from a UBC political discussion group into an anti-revisionist organization that supported Mao Zedong's Chinese Communist Party in the Sino-Soviet split. This organisation (in Canada) became the CPC (ML) with Bains as its founding leader.

In 1965, Bains founded the "Internationalists in Ireland", while he was working as a lecturer in microbiology at Trinity College, Dublin. In 1970, they renamed themselves the Communist Party of Ireland (Marxist–Leninist).

In 1967, Bains held a small conference of students in London with the express objective determining the future of the anti-revisionist movement, the "Necessity for Change" conference. While the Irish Communist Organisation disagreed with the other delegates and walked out of the meeting, Bains became known as a leader of the anti-revisionist movement internationally, and assisted in establishing Marxist–Leninist parties around the world.

In addition to founding the CPC (ML) and CPI (ML), Bains is regarded as a major influence on the Revolutionary Communist Party of Britain (Marxist–Leninist), the Communist Party of Trinidad and Tobago, and the Communist Ghadar Party of India. Bains was also responsible for the founding of the Hindustani Ghadar Party (Organisation of Indian Marxist–Leninists Abroad). He held a leading influence in the Marxist–Leninist Party, USA in the 1970s, although it later split from the CPC (ML) and dissolved in 1993. Left publications such as Modern Communism have written articles on his legacy.

Political affiliations 
As a young man, Bains was a member of the Communist Party of India, but after the party accepted Nikita Khrushchev's speech, "On the Cult of Personality and Its Consequences", he apparently quit, adopting a pro-Stalinist viewpoint.

Later, following the Sino-Soviet split, Bains' groups and parties held a strident pro-China position from the 1960s and into the 1970s. Bains himself openly identified as Maoist. The CPC (ML) was the first significant Maoist formation in Canada, although it was joined by two other Maoist groups in the mid-1970s and Bains engaged in polemics against these groups as well.

With Mao Zedong's death in 1976 and the subsequent Sino-Albanian split, Bains renounced Maoism. Following the leadership of Enver Hoxha and the Party of Labour of Albania (PLA), he became a prominent spokesperson of the PLA's line internationally, agreeing with the conclusion that numerous communist parties had devolved into "social imperialism" (such as Leonid Brezhnev's USSR, Josip Broz Tito's Yugoslavia, Kim Il-sung's North Korea and Fidel Castro's Cuba), while condemning Chinese revisionism, and Eurocommunism.

After the overturn of socialism in Albania, Bains again re-appraised his ideological outlook. He visited Cuba and announced he had changed his outlook towards the country and now viewed it as a successful example of socialism. The CPC (ML) also re-appraised its view of North Korea into a positive light. By the end of his life, Bains' writings made fewer and fewer references to anti-revisionism and socialist revolution, and developed the theme of democratic renewal and the self-empowerment of the people.

Death and legacy 
After his death, a memorial was erected in the honour of Bains and other CPC (ML) "fallen comrades" in Ottawa's Beechwood Cemetery which is also the national cemetery of the Royal Canadian Mounted Police. Poet George Elliot Clarke published a poem titled "Homage to Hardial Bains" in 2000 in the Oyster Boy Review. Bains' legacy is debated today, and he has been criticized posthumously by a number of writers such as Ben Seattle, a US leftist and former supporter.

Bains wrote several books, including Necessity for Change!, Modern Communism, Visiting Cuba, If You Love Your Class and Thinking About the Sixties, and many articles, pamphlets and speeches.

Sandra L. Smith, his widow, also served as leader of the CPC (ML).

NFC thought 
Hardial Bains identified his main line of thinking as "Necessity for Change" or NFC thought. Formulated in the early 1960s, NFC thought brought together a variety of Marxist phraseology and addressed some existentialist ideas popular during that time. His primary concern was how to bring about social revolution and the relationship of this process with the individual. "A successful revolution can transform the world in some very definite direction, but whether it will happen, in the final analysis, is still dependent on the world," Bains wrote, arguing that "Unless it is profoundly appreciated that there is a Necessity for Change at each point [in history and the struggle], and theoretical and practical measures are taken to bring about the change, there is no possibility of creating the subjective conditions for revolution."

The recognition of the Necessity for Change, which created those subjective conditions for revolution, would create a new level of consciousness which broke with the anti-consciousness of bourgeois thought. "The [human] brain reflects the sharpening class contradictions in the society and other developments. Either the individual transforms this reflection into social consciousness and becomes part of the human factor/social consciousness or remains part of the anti-human factor/anti-consciousness," he said, writing that:

The battle cry of The Internationalists was "Change the World," while the battle cry of the capitalist class was "change the individual." The NFC analysis of the "I", of the existence of this "relate or relationship" placed the task of changing the world on a profound social basis. A "relate" or "relationship," if it is to be true to itself, must be objective, independent of everyone and dependent on the world. This relate or relationship must be continuously discovered and rediscovered in the course of struggle. It constitutes the centre around which all other consciousness is placed.

But for Bains individual consciousness alone was not sufficient and needed to be joined with a political party. "The crucial ingredient for victory is the human factor/social consciousness, but this factor cannot exist in a vacuum. This factor finds its highest expression in an organisation, which is strengthened on an on-going basis with the sound foundation of a new, modern and revolutionary culture in ideological and social forms," he wrote, adding that "A Communist Party, if it is to realise its tasks in a mature, professional and on-going manner, must develop revolutionary culture in ideological form, on the one hand, and the revolutionisation of culture in social form, on the other."

Bains strongly decried what he termed revisionist parties. "Revisionists and opportunists of various kinds," he wrote, "present the bourgeois social forms as the ideal motivating humanity [...] Besides fighting for "a bigger slice of the pie" and for job security which this system can never provide, these people, as dogmatists and fanatics, oppose everyone fighting for social revolution." Instead, "The act of joining CPC(ML) will itself be a great leap forward for the creation of a new and affirmed humanity, in which every act of human beings becomes another act for that affirmation, the measure of what is truly human." During his time as leader, the CPC (ML) swung from actively supporting Maoist China, to denouncing Maoism and embracing Enver Hoxha's Albania and later, after the over-turn of socialism in that country, a more muted support of North Korea and Cuba.

Bains remained true, however, to his pro-Stalinist orientation, asserting in the late 1980s that "They say that Stalin had a plan to conquer the world. Stalin was alive until 1953. There is not one single country in the world which was occupied by the Soviet Union while Stalin was alive."

Publications 
 Hardial Bains. The Question is Really One of Word and Deed (pamphlet), Progressive Cultural Association, 1997. .
 Hardial Bains. The Call of the Martyrs: On the Crisis in India and the Present Situation in the Punjab. National Publications Centre, 1985. .
 Hardial Bains. Modern Communism (pamphlet), Communist Party of Canada (Marxist–Leninist), reprinted 1996. , .
 Hardial Bains. Communism 1989-1991, Ideological Studies Centre, 1991.
 Hardial Bains. Necessity for Change! The Dialectic Lives! (pamphlet), The Internationalists, 1967. Reprinted by Communist Party of Canada (Marxist–Leninist), 1998.

References

External links 
 Article on Bains from the People's Voice, paper of the Communist Ghadar Party of India 
 Poem by George Elliot Clarke titled "Homage to Hardial Bains" in the Oyster Boy Review

Canadian Sikhs
1939 births
1997 deaths
British political party founders
Canadian political party founders
Communist Party of Canada (Marxist–Leninist) politicians
Indian emigrants to Canada
Politicians from Ottawa
Punjabi people
Anti-revisionists
Canadian politicians of Indian descent
Canadian communists
Burials at Beechwood Cemetery (Ottawa)